Capitata is a suborder of Hydrozoa, a class of marine invertebrates belonging to the phylum Cnidaria.

Characteristics
Members of this suborder are characterised by the tentacles of the polyps terminating in knobs. In some species these are only present in juvenile forms being replaced in adults by more threadlike tentacles. A high nematocyst concentration is present in the knobs. A few species in this group are better known as their solitary medusa form than as their polyp form. These include Sarsia, Polyorchis and Cladonema.

Families

According to the World Register of Marine Species, the following families are found in this suborder :

Asyncorynidae Kramp, 1949
Cladocorynidae Allman, 1872
Cladonematidae Gegenbaur, 1857
Corynidae Johnston, 1836
Halimedusidae Arai & Brinckmann-Voss, 1980
Hydrocorynidae Rees, 1957
Milleporidae Fleming, 1828
Moerisiidae Poche, 1914
Pennariidae McCrady, 1859
Porpitidae Goldfuss, 1818
Pseudosolanderiidae Bouillon & Gravier-Bonnet, 1988
Rosalindidae Bouillon, 1985
Solanderiidae Marshall, 1892
Sphaerocorynidae Prévot, 1959
Teissieridae Bouillon, 1978
Tricyclusidae Kramp, 1949
Zancleidae Russell, 1953
Zancleopsidae Bouillon, 1978

References

 
Anthoathecata